Filip Borowski (born 6 October 2003) is a Polish professional footballer who plays as a right-back for I liga club Zagłębie Sosnowiec, on loan from Lech Poznań.

Career statistics

Club

References

External links
 
 

2003 births
Living people
Sportspeople from Bydgoszcz
Polish footballers
Association football defenders
Poland youth international footballers
Lech Poznań II players
Lech Poznań players
Zagłębie Sosnowiec players
Ekstraklasa players
I liga players
II liga players